The Christian Centre — For a Germany according to GOD's commandments, abbreviated CM, is a Christian conservative fringe party in Germany. Without parliamentary representation, it is a party that represents strict conservative Christian values. Unlike the more moderate Party of Bible-abiding Christians, the party's core values overlap with those of far-right ideology, emphasising national conservatism, anti-pluralism, anti-LGBT and ethnic collectivism.

History
The CM was founded on 27 August 1988 by Adelgunde Mertensacker after she was voted out of the German Centre Party. Mertensacker remained president of the party until she died on 12 October 2013, after which no new president was selected. During their active time, the party was largely unsuccessful, never receiving a municipal mandate, and never exceeding 0.2% of votes in a European Parliament election. The CM explained their overall low popularity by the "moral decay in Europe" and that their political program was "too sophisticated".

In February 2016, the party announced that it would no longer contest elections but instead would focus on political activism.

Election results

Federal Parliament (Bundestag)

References

External links
 

Anti-Islam political parties in Europe
Christian political parties in Germany
Conservative parties in Germany
German nationalist political parties
Nationalist parties in Germany
Anti-Islam sentiment in Germany
National conservative parties
Social conservative parties